Genda Lal Dixit (30 November 1888 – 21 December 1920) was an Indian revolutionary who worked as a schoolteacher at Auraiya in the district of Etawah, United Province, British India. He led a group of Indian freedom fighters (revolutionaries), known as the Shivaji Samiti, who engaged in subversive activities against the British Raj.  As a consequence of their involvement in the Mainpuri Conspiracy of 1918, Dixit was arrested and imprisoned first at Agra fort and later at Mainpuri. He managed to escape from prison and died on 21 December 1920 in a government hospital at Delhi.

Dixit was associated with Ram Prasad Bismil.

Early life
Genda Lal Dixit was born on 30 November 1888 in Baha tehsil of Agra district in United Provinces. His father's name was Bhola Nath Dixit. His mother died when he was around three years old.

After completing his primary education in his native village, he attended the Government High School in Etawah and later matriculated from Agra. He became a teacher in DAV School Auraiya, United Province.

Revolutionary activities
When Lord Curzon, the Viceroy of British India, ordered the division of Bengal, a Swadeshi Movement arose throughout the country. Dixit read newspaper articles written in protest by Bal Gangadhar Tilak and was inspired to emulate in United Province the celebrations of Shivaji Utsav in Maharashtra. He took leave of absence from his job and went to the nearby princely state of Gwalior, where the populace was sympathetic to the idea of independence from Britain. There he encouraged youths to support the movement for change and to take up arms.

Dixit established the Shivaji Samiti as a means to his ends. It was initially involved in distribution of seditious literature but he saw an opportunity to unite the dacoits of the region and proposed this in meetings held in the Bhind and Morena districts of Central Province. He motivated the dacoits to participate in a guerilla war by retelling stories of Shivaji, a Maratha leader who had used similar tactics during the reign of the Mughal emperor, Aurangzeb. The dacoits raised funds for the venture through a series of robberies in rural areas of Agra and Gwalior.

The guidance of Dixit was sought by Ram Prasad Bismil, a fellow revolutionary who had established his own organization, called Matrivedi ("Altar of Motherland"), in the city of Shahjahanpur, United Province. The two men were put in touch with each other by Somdev, who thought that the effectiveness of Bismil would be improved if he was supported by a more experienced person. A period of collaboration followed.

On 28 January 1918, Bismil published a pamphlet titled Deshvasiyon Ke Nam Sandesh ("A Message to Countrymen") and distributed it amongst the public along with his poem Mainpuri Ki Pratigya ("Vow of Mainpuri"). Three more looting raids took place to raise funds in 1918. Police searched for them in and around Mainpuri while they were selling the books proscribed by the U.P. Government in the Delhi Congress of 1918.

When police found them, Bismil absconded with the books unsold. When he was planning another looting between Delhi and Agra, a police team arrived and firing started from both the sides. Bismil was very cautious: he jumped into the river Yamuna and swam underwater. The police and his companions thought that he had died in the encounter. Dixit was arrested along with his other companions and he was kept in Agra fort.

Bismil met Dixit in the fort and they planned an escape. Dixit was taken to Mainpuri where a criminal case known as the Mainpuri Conspiracy was filed against the youth of Matrivedi. Dixit offered to provide information relating to the robberies in United Province and was believed by the police, who locked him up with the Matrivedi youngsters. He escaped from the police jail in Mainpuri and fled to Delhi where he lived undetected until death. On 1 November 1919 the Judiciary Magistrate of Mainpuri announced the judgement against all accused and declared Dixit and Bismil to be absconders.

Death

Dixit died in hospital, having contracted tuberculosis.

His biography was written by Ram Prasad Bismil which was published in the Hindi magazine Prabha from Kanpur (issue of 3 September 1924) with the pen name of 'Agyat'.

References

1888 births
1920 deaths
Indian revolutionaries
People from Auraiya district
Prisoners and detainees of British India